John T. Ryan Trophies are awards of excellence presented by Canadian Institute of Mining, Metallurgy and Petroleum (CIM) to a mine in a given category which experiences the lowest accident frequency during the previous year in all of Canada.  Three national trophies are given each year, one to a metal mine, a coal mine and one to a select mine.  An award is also given out to the mine with the lowest accident frequency in each of the following regions:
Quebec and East
Ontario
Prairies and Northwest Territories
British Columbia and Yukon.
The award is given by Mine Safety Appliances Company as a memorial to the founder John T. Ryan.

Award winners

Metal Mines

Select Mines

Coal Mines

See also

 List of occupational health and safety awards

References 

Canadian Institute of Mining, Metallurgy and Petroleum
Occupational safety and health awards